Earls Barton is a village and civil parish in Northamptonshire, notable for its Anglo-Saxon church and shoe-making heritage. The village is in North Northamptonshire and was previously in the Borough of Wellingborough until 2021. At the time of the 2011 census, the population was 5,387. Earls Barton is renowned for its remarkable Anglo-Saxon heritage.

History
The original Anglo-Saxon village was known as Bere-tun, or "a place for growing Barley", and was one of several Spring line settlements constructed along the north bank of the River Nene. Immediately prior to 1066, it was held by Bondi the staller, an Anglo-Danish noble, and senior member of Edward the Confessor's household; around 1070, it passed to Waltheof, Earl of Northumbria.

In 1070, he married Judith of Lens, niece of William the Conqueror, recorded in the Domesday Book as owner of the land and mill of Buarton(e). He was made Earl of Northampton in 1071; it is thought these links, and those with the Earl of Huntingdon, later gave the village its prefix "Earls".

In The King's England: Northamptonshire, edited by Arthur Mee, it notes:

Architectural historian Nikolaus Pevsner disagrees with this assessment, describing it as:

He goes on to argue that the castle was founded at the time of the Norman conquest of England and its builder ignored the then existing church, leaving it in its bailey, for a later demolition that never happened.

In the 13th century, shoes began to be made from leather bought in nearby Northampton, while the village also had its own tanyard, which remained in operation until 1984. During the 14th and 15th centuries, sheep shearing gave way to the manufacture of woollen cloth, which remained a major cottage industry until the shift to the newly industrialised north several centuries later.

Census data shows that from 1801 to 1850, the village population grew from 729 to over 2,000. In 1880, the Barker shoe company  was founded in Earls Barton, and remains there to the present day.

Between 1913 and 1921, ironstone was produced in two local quarries; the first, situated north of Doddington Road, began operations in 1913, the second in 1916, west of Wellingborough Road. A 3-foot gauge tramway connected both quarries to the northern terminal of the gas-powered aerial ropeway, where the ore was loaded into buckets. It was then taken across the River Nene to Castle Ashby and Earls Barton station, and dumped into railway wagons.

The tramway initially used horses, until a steam locomotive was bought in 1914 to replace them. Quarrying was at first done by hand, using explosives, then steam diggers were used from 1918. In 1925 the original quarry was reopened, not for iron ore, but for the obtaining of gannister (white silica sand). A new 2 foot gauge tramway was used to take the sand to Wellingborough Road where it was loaded into lorries for dispatch. This tramway used a small diesel locomotive. It is not clear how long gannister was quarried but the quarry still appears to have been in use in 1949 and a rusty quarry machine was in situ in the 1970s.  The quarried area has mostly been built on but some traces of the system remain including part of a final gullet north of Doddington Road and the remains of a bridge in that road. The remains of the tipping point from the tramway to the ropeway can be seen from Dowthorpe Hill and Milbury.

Parish church

The Church of England parish church of All Saints has been a feature of the village for many centuries. Its Anglo-Saxon tower dates to ca 970 AD. Pevsner says that the church tower as built was not originally followed by a nave, but a chancel. He also describes the tower's bell openings as being very unusual, having five narrow arches each on turned balusters.

All Saints' underwent two phases of Norman enlargement, one at either end of the 12th century.

Other notable features include:
a Norman or Anglo-Saxon door and arcading on the western end of the building – this was the original entrance to the church,
a medieval rood screen,
a Victorian font and pews, and
a modern 20th-century inner porch and windows

Apart from the Saxon tower, the church is mainly built from Northamptonshire ironstone and limestone, while the tower was constructed from Barnack stone and infilled with local limestone.

Another feature is that every century from the 10th century onwards is represented in either the fabric or the fittings of the church building. It is decorated with the work of the local artist Henry Bird.

The church was featured on a 1972 postage stamp issued by the Royal Mail, as part of a set depicting village churches.

There are three other churches in Earls Barton: Methodist, Baptist and Roman Catholic.  Another Anglo-Saxon church can be found nearby in Brixworth. The  Methodist Church is on Broad Street; the church building is over 200 years old and is home to many village groups including the 1st Earls Barton Boys' Brigade, badminton club and wives group. The Baptist church is now deconsecrated and used as a children's nursery.

Miscellany
The village was the inspiration for the film Kinky Boots and part of the film was shot here. It is based on the true story of a local boot factory which turned from Dr Marten's, their own Provider brand and traditional boots to producing "fetish" footwear in order to save the ailing family business and the jobs of his workers. The village has a history of ingenious industry including the Barker's shoe factory, a woven label company, and the White & Co factory that produced Tredair and Dr Marten's boots until 2003.

In the village's small market square there is a pharmacy run by a member of the Jeyes chemist's family, which family invented and manufactured Jeyes Fluid. The family also ran the  Philadelphus Jeyes chemist chain and  lived nearby at Holly Lodge in Boughton.

Earls Barton is renowned for its 'Dr Fright's Night' halloween shows hosted at White's Farm and is popular with neighbouring villages and towns.

In snowy conditions Kensit's field becomes a popular attraction for sledgers due to its steep hill.

After a change in policy regarding public libraries by Northamptonshire County Council, in 2019/2020 the local community took over the running of the village library.

A murder that took place in the village in 2019 was featured on the Sky documentary series Killer in My Village (Season 5, Episode 10).

Local sport
The village has a cricket team. The exact date that this club was established is unknown however there has been cricket in Earls Barton since the late 19th century. The club at present has two teams that play in the Northamptonshire Cricket League. It also has Kwik Cricket, U11's, U13's, U15 and U17's teams.

The local football team, Earls Barton FC was formed in the late 19th century - with the exact date now not known. When Northampton Town FC  (The Cobblers) was first formed in 1897, their first game was against Earls Barton United (EBU) on 18 September 1897. The final score Cobblers 4 - EBU 1. Currently Earls Barton United Football Club compete in the Premier Division of the Northants Combination, which is at Step 7 of the English non-league pyramid.

Earls Barton Stadium (locally known as the pioneer sportsground) was a greyhound racing and speedway stadium on Station Road just south of the village. It operated from the 1940s until the 1970s and also hosted Go Karting and Banger racing.

"Earls Barton Motors" was home to Britain's 1957 stock car World Champion, Aubrey Leighton, who was a recognised innovator and builder of stock cars, as well as a racer.

Neighbourhood Plan
In 2012 the Parish Council asked for volunteers to investigate and develop a Neighbourhood Plan following the introduction of the Localism Act. A Project Group made up of local residents, elected members and a project manager with experience of planning was formed and met monthly.  Following an appropriate framework, the group worked with the village residents to produce a Plan, which was adopted after a referendum. The plan was submitted to the Borough Council of Wellingborough for examination The Council integrated the Plan into planning consideration for the next twenty years.

Commerce and Trade
In April 2017, the closure of the last branch of a bank or building society within the village was announced.

Market Harborough Building Society (MHBS) wrote to customers announcing the closure of the branch located in Jeyes of Earls Barton, stating the new 'local' branches are in Kettering or Rothwell. MHBS cited lack of footfall and transactions as people undertake more banking online as the main reason for the branch closure.

In 2016 the Post Office in the village, a local sorting office and main Post Office, closed and a small branch counter opened in the Premier store on Station Road.  Any collection of mail moved to the Northampton main sorting office from the branch  .

The closure or significant change of these branches presented the end of an era for Earls Barton; in recent history the village was home to branches of the Nationwide Building Society, Midland Bank, Barclays Bank and Lloyds Bank.

In the run-up before Christmas 2016, The Old Swan closed for refurbishment and was re-opened by a local landlord; around the same period, the Saxon Tavern opened in the old Lloyds Bank branch next to E Lee Butchers on The Square.  Whilst these two establishments have grown and attracted more customers, The Stag on Wellingborough Road temporarily closed and as of April 2016 has a temporary manager in place.

In 2020, during the health crisis the UK found itself within, The Old Swan provided free stew to the community funded by off-sales with home delivery.  The joint landlord, Paul Dexter, was interviewed by local media and the service was mentioned on BBC One's The One Show.

White's Nursery operates a market shop and show grounds, with a planning application to redevelop the retail parts of the site to increase retail space.  The show grounds host annual and more frequent events such as Car Shows.

Community life
1st Earls Barton Boys Brigade
Badminton Club
Earls Barton Fire Station
Earls Barton Historical Society
Earls Barton Primary School
Earls Barton Library
Earls Barton United Football Club
Earls Barton Museum of Village Life
Earls Barton Music
Earls Barton Parish Council
Earls Barton Tennis Club
Earls Barton Youth Club
Saxon Pre-School 
Starfruit Youth Theatre Company
Under The Tower - Drama Group
Pied Piper Pre-School
Earls Barton Carnival
Earls Barton Soap Box Derby

Pictures

References

Sources

External links

Parish Council website 
Northants County Guides: Earls Barton

 
Villages in Northamptonshire
Tourist attractions in Northamptonshire
Grade II listed buildings in Northamptonshire
North Northamptonshire
Civil parishes in Northamptonshire